Mariana & Scarlett (Hilos de amor) is a Colombian telenovela television series. It was produced by Caracol TV and starred Carolina Acevedo, Carolina Guerra and Patrick Delmas with the participation of Bianca Arango and Juliana Galvis.

Synopsis
Mariana and Scarlett are two middle-class women, "cachesudas", with different personalities. Mariana is serious, sweet, quiet and wants to do everything the right way; while Scarlett is funny, mischievous, aggressive and wants to do everything quickly. The first wants to start her own clothing shop whilst the latter wants to be an internationally recognized model.
Then they meet a man by name Roberto White/Bobby Casablanca who will change their lives.

Cast
 Carolina Guerra as Scarlett García
 Carolina Acevedo as Mariana García
 Patrick Delmas as Roberto White / Bobby Casablanca
 Bianca Arango as Beatriz Durán
 Juliana Galvis as Lina Durán
 Juan Diego Sánchez as Fernando "Fercho" León 
 Pedro Pallares as Juan Carlos "Juanca" Durán
 Alejandro Lopez as Miguel Ángel Lozano
 Nicolle Santamaría as Adriana "Adri" del Pilar
 Andrés Parra as Antonio "Tony" Buendia
 Carlos Duplat as Gonzalo White
 Saín Castro as Augusto García
 Luigi Aicardi as Fabricio Donisetti
 Immanuella Alalibo as Princess Lorago
 Ana Cristina Botero as Nurse/Mrs Alicia del Pilar (Adriana's mum)
 Ángela Gómez as Martha the head seamstress at Beatriz Durán
 Liliana Escobar as Ánghela (White textiles receptionist)
 ? As Lorena Jaramillio (White textiles adviser and Fernando's first girlfriend)
 ? As Adelita San Juan (Model agent & Roberto white's first girlfriend)
 ? As Natalia (Juan Carlos's niece)
 ? As Isabelle (Juan Carlos's mother)
 ? As Mr Cifuentes (paid criminal)
 ? As Bonnie Aguire (Scarlett's mother)
 ? As Plastica (Scarlett's mother's cellmate in prison)
 ? As Garza (cellmate in prison)
 ? as Counsellor/Attorney Larotta (Lena Duran's lawyer)
 ? as Counsellor/Attorney Sebastian Maura (Mariana & Scarlett's lawyer)

International release

References

External links 
 

2010s Colombian television series
2010 Colombian television series debuts
2011 Colombian television series endings